William Scott (born 8 February 1952) is an Australian long-distance runner. He competed in the men's 10,000 metres at the 1980 Summer Olympics.

References

1952 births
Living people
Athletes (track and field) at the 1980 Summer Olympics
Australian male long-distance runners
Olympic athletes of Australia
Place of birth missing (living people)